Štefan Fabian (born 10 February 1981) is a Slovak former professional ice hockey player. Fabian previously played in the Slovak Extraliga for HC Košice, HK 36 Skalica, HK Nitra and HK Poprad. In the Kazakhstan Hockey Championship for Yertis Pavlodar.

Career statistics

Regular season and playoffs

International

References

External links

1981 births
Living people
Sportspeople from Košice
Slovak ice hockey defencemen
HC Košice players
HK 36 Skalica players
HK Poprad players
HK Nitra players
Yertis Pavlodar players
HK Spišská Nová Ves players
Expatriate ice hockey players in Kazakhstan
Slovak expatriate sportspeople in Kazakhstan
Slovak expatriate ice hockey people